Ludington State Park is a public recreation area located two miles north of Ludington, Michigan, occupying  between the shores of Lake Michigan and Hamlin Lake. The state park is crossed by a one-mile stretch of the Big Sable River and is home to the  Big Sable Point Lighthouse, which dates from 1876.

Ecology
The state park encompasses multiple ecosystems including sand dune, forest, wetlands, and marshlands. The park contains the southern 2,820 acres (11.4 km²) of the Big Sable Dunes complex, with the Nordhouse Dunes Wilderness, immediately north of the park, preserving the northern half of the complex.

History
The park began through the efforts of the Isaac Walton League to have 800 acres held by the federal government as a lighthouse preserve transferred to the state of Michigan for the purpose of creating a state park. The park was established in 1927 after the U.S. Congress authorized the transfer. During the 1930s, the Civilian Conservation Corps was active in the park making improvements that included building the park's Arts and Crafts style beach house. In 2002, the  U.S. Coast Guard deeded  the  lighthouse station complex to the Michigan Department of Natural Resources.

Activities and amenities
The park's water activities include fishing and swimming on Lake Michigan and Hamlin Lake and tubing on Big Sable River. The park offers 21.5 miles of hiking trails, 10 miles of cross-country ski trails, a 2-mile bicycle trail, and a 4-mile canoe trail. The park has four campgrounds containing a total of 360 campsites that include remote hike-in sites. The park also offers a cafe and lighthouse tours and is a stop on the Mason County Sculpture Trail.

References

External links

Ludington State Park Michigan Department of Natural Resources
Ludington State Park Map Michigan Department of Natural Resources
Sable Points Lighthouse Keepers Association

Protected areas of Mason County, Michigan
State parks of Michigan
Important Bird Areas of Michigan
Protected areas established in 1926
1926 establishments in Michigan
IUCN Category III
Civilian Conservation Corps in Michigan